Guinea has sent athletes to every Summer Olympic Games held since 1968 except for 1972 and 1976, although the country has never won an Olympic medal. No athletes from Guinea have competed in any Winter Olympic Games.

The National Olympic Committee was created in 1964 and recognized by the International Olympic Committee in 1965.

Medal tables

Medals by Summer Games

Olympic participants

Summer Olympics

See also
 List of flag bearers for Guinea at the Olympics
 Guinea at the Paralympics

External links